Labidochromis mbenjii is a species of cichlid endemic to Lake Malawi where it is only known to occur in the area around the Mbenji Islands.  This species can reach a length of  SL.  It can also be found in the aquarium trade.

References

Fish of Malawi
mbenjii
Fish described in 1982
Taxonomy articles created by Polbot
Fish of Lake Malawi